The 2015 Türk Telecom İzmir Cup was a professional tennis tournament played on hard courts. It was the eighth edition of the tournament which is part of the 2015 ATP Challenger Tour. It took place in İzmir, Turkey between 21 and 27 September 2015.

Singles main-draw entrants

Seeds

 1 Rankings are as of September 14, 2015.

Other entrants
The following players received wildcards into the singles main draw:
  Sarp Ağabigün
  Altuğ Çelikbilek
  Barış Ergüden
  Barkın Yalçınkale

The following player entered into the singles main draw as a protected ranking:
  Marco Chiudinelli

The following players received entry from the qualifying draw:
  Petros Chrysochos
  Ilya Ivashka
  Daniel Masur 
  Aleksandre Metreveli

The following players received entry as a lucky loser:
  Michal Konečný
  Maximilian Neuchrist
  Andrei Vasilevski

Champions

Singles

 Lukáš Lacko def.  Marius Copil, 6–3, 7–6(7–5)

Doubles

 Saketh Myneni /  Divij Sharan vs.  Malek Jaziri /  Denys Molchanov, 7–6(7–5), 4–6, 0–0 retired

External links
Official Website

 
Türk Telecom İzmir Cup
2015 in Turkish tennis